Adam Stephen Berry (born 20 February 1997) is an Australian professional footballer who currently plays for Blacktown City.

Berry played youth football for Blacktown City, Leeds United and Central Coast Mariners before making his professional debut for the Mariners in 2016.

He has appeared for the Australian under-20 side.

Early life
Berry grew up playing football in Castle Hill from age four, and attended Galston High School.

Playing career

Club
In 2013, Berry signed with Leeds United's youth team on a two-year deal after thirteen years playing for Blacktown City. The deal eventuated following a match in Malaysia for the Australia under-13 side where a scout identified Berry. He made his first start for the under-18s on 4 November 2013, scoring in a 3–1 win over Derby County. In May 2015, Berry was released by Leeds.

Berry returned to Australia in mid-2015, and joined Central Coast Mariners, where he represented the senior side in pre-season matches as a trialist, including setting up a goal for Daniel Heffernan against Western Sydney Wanderers. He was later named in the Central Coast Mariners youth team. He made his competitive debut for the club in February 2016, coming on as a substitute in a loss to Melbourne City. He signed a one-year senior deal with the Mariners in May 2016. In August 2016 this was extended for an extra two seasons.

He scored his first goal for the Mariners in a 1–1 draw with Western Sydney Wanderers on 29 October 2016, finishing from close range after a defensive error by Wanderers centre half Robert Cornthwaite.

International
Berry made his debut for the Australian under-20 side in May 2015 in a loss to the United States in Gosford, coming on as a second-half substitute for Jaushua Sotirio. He was subsequently selected in the Australia squad for 2016 AFC U-19 Championship qualification.

See also
List of Central Coast Mariners FC players

References

External links

1997 births
Living people
Association football midfielders
Australia under-20 international soccer players
Australian soccer players
Leeds United F.C. players
Central Coast Mariners FC players
Central Coast Mariners Academy players
A-League Men players
National Premier Leagues players